Neomelodramatic/Roll (ネオメロドラマティック/ROLL) is the seventeenth single by the Japanese pop-rock band Porno Graffitti. It was released on March 2, 2005.

Porno Graffitti's first is a double A-side single, 5th lead single of the album "Thumpχ". When the time of introduction of the work without the person referred to, such as "both the A-side," "double A-side", was referred to as "double-face single".

Track listing

References

2005 singles
Porno Graffitti songs
2005 songs
Sony Music singles